Kissena refers to several locations in the borough of Queens, New York City, U.S.:

 Kissena Boulevard
 Kissena Creek
 Kissena Park